Faubourg Livaudais is a name for a neighborhood in Central New Orleans that some people have re-adopted based upon the name of a former plantation that was in the area. The neighborhood is largely residential, and contains mostly modest sized homes.

History
Faubourg Livaudais was a plantation long before it was a neighborhood located Uptown New Orleans in Louisiana. The wife of Jacques Francois Enoul de Livaudais, Marie Celeste Marigny, sold her plantation to a syndicate of American businessmen. When the property was subdivided by the surveyor of Jefferson Parish, Faubourg Livaudais was the name given to this neighborhood, founded in 1832. In the 1800s, many of the neighborhoods in the Jefferson Parish area were given the first name Faubourg. Faubourgs were sometimes named after the plantations owner’s last name.

Much of what has changed are the surroundings with new developments that have evolved over hundreds of years. When this neighborhood was first founded it was majority Americans, as opposed to French, Spanish or Creole. Caucasians took up most of the neighborhood but that gradually changed over the years. African Americans took up a large amount of the population and make up the majority now. Many people from different cultures and backgrounds stay in this area and live in a historical home.

The neighborhood boundaries are located from St. Charles to Simon Bolivar and Jackson to Washington. Faubourg Liviaudias is historical for its cemetery and churches. According to the Faubourg Livaudais Facebook page, First Street Peck Wesley United Methodist on Dryades St. has been running for over 180 years. The neighborhood members care a lot about one another and make sure they are there when someone needs it. There are free health screenings and other information given out to members of the community via email, Facebook, and newsletters. Members of the community try to keep the area clean and preserve it as best they can, after all this is an historical location. Volunteers pick up trash, clean up houses, etc. Since Hurricane Katrina, there has been significant activity in the neighborhood restoring houses and building new homes on vacant lots.

Landmarks
The Faubourg Livaudais area is within the National Register Central City Historic District and has many notable historical buildings and institutions, including up to about twenty churches throughout the area (Third Rose of Sharon Baptist Church, Gloryland Mt. Gillion Baptist Church, Second Mount Carmel Baptist Church, and Mt. Bethel Baptist Church, Pressing Onward Baptist Church, Second New Light Missionary Baptist Church, First African Baptist Church of New Orleans, etc.) These churches are very important to Faubourg Livaudais because of many current residents' great faith in religion. Religion also gives the people something to come together under, which is one of the main goals of the city. “For institutions…to connect them to the surrounding community and create working partnerships between the various institutions”. As these relationships are strengthened, people are inspired to build more institutions and projects to increase friendships and long lasting relationships in the community. Another important historic landmark in the neighborhood is the former Dryades Public Library branch opened in 1915 with funding from Andrew Carnegie. It was the first public library in New Orleans that was open to black citizens. The building is currently used by the James Singleton Charter School.

Recent Developments
One of the most recent developments near Faubourg Livaudais area is a shopping center with various stores and restaurants for citizens and tourists to enjoy while in the area. This development is called Magnolia Marketplace and includes Ross, TJ Maxx, Shoe Carnival, Ulta, Pet Smart and Michael’s along with Raising Cane’s fried chicken, Taco Bell, Capital One Bank. It is adjacent to the Harmony Oaks community, on the site of the former C.J. Peete/Magnolia public housing development. An outdoor marketplace called the Market on Lasalle has been developed, and the youth art group YaYa is building their facility just next door. The famous historic Dew Drop Inn on Lasalle is in the process of renovations for a new use.

Conclusion
Between the old historical landmarks and the new developments that are being put into place nearby, Faubourg Livaudais is an ideal neighborhood to visit and or live in. This community is deeply rooted in its faith, and also takes the time to modernize itself to attract more visitors. This neighborhood is one of a kind and continues to move forward over time.

Geography
Every neighborhood has its own unique and different geography that describes the people that live there along with the culture of the neighborhood itself, and Faubourg Livaudais is no different. Neighborhoods serve as geographical frames of orientation, encompassing the demographic, economic and ecologic physiognomies of a particular place. The definition of a "neighborhood," however, relies heavily on perspective. Neighborhoods have different geographic gauges that assist different purposes. For example, metropolitan governments often define a neighborhood as a very large area for planning, providing services or maintaining infrastructure. Faubourg Livaudais is a subsection of the area that many residents refer to as Central City or just Uptown.

Schools/Education
Faubourg Livaudais is located between St. Charles to Simon Bolivar and Jackson to Washington. There is one school within the boundaries of the neighborhood—James Singleton Charter School. However, other public charter and private schools are nearby.

Demographics
The neighborhood is home to both families and single people, and falls within the boundaries of Central City. The neighborhood is majority African American.

References

https://web.archive.org/web/20140426202152/http://www.neworleanspubliclibrary.org/~nopl/links/nolinks/faubourgs.pdf  
http://www.nola.gov/neighborhood-engagement/organizations/faubourg-livaudais/  
https://www.facebook.com/FaubourgLivaudais  
http://louisiana.gov/Government/Executive_Branch  
http://www.nola.gov/neighborhood-engagement/organizations/faubourg-livaudais  
http://nutrias.org/links/nolinks/faubourgs.pdf  
https://web.archive.org/web/20140429125930/http://neworleanscitybusiness.com/blog/tag/faubourg-livaudais/

Neighborhoods in New Orleans